Škare is a village in Otočac municipality in Lika-Senj County, Croatia.

References

Populated places in Lika-Senj County